Park Dong-ju (also transliterated Park Dong-joo, born 27 March 1963) is a South Korean equestrian. He competed in two events at the 1988 Summer Olympics.

References

External links
 

1963 births
Living people
South Korean male equestrians
Olympic equestrians of South Korea
Equestrians at the 1988 Summer Olympics
Place of birth missing (living people)